Arwā bint al-Ḥārith was a eloquence and rhetoric sahabiya and the cousin of Muhammad and Ali. She was the daughter of Al-Harith ibn Abd al-Muttalib and Ghaziyya bint Qays. She was married to Abu Wida'a (al-Harith) ibn Sabarah ibn Sa'id ibn Sa'd ibn Sahm al-Sahmi al-Qurayshi and had ten children: Wida'a, Abd Allah, al-Saib, al-Muttalib, Sufyan, Hakim, Abu Sufyan (Yazid), al-Rabi', Umm Kulthum (Rabi'a), Umm Jamil (Zaynab), and Umm Hakim (Fatima).

References

Family of Muhammad
Women companions of the Prophet